The Paraleucopidae are a family of Acalyptratae flies first elevated to family level in 2019. Their placement with in the Acalyptrataes is uncertain. The clade includes the genera Paraleucopis, Mallochianamyia and Schizostomyia from the New World and undescribed species from Australia.

Genera
Mallochianamyia Santos-Neto, 1996
Paraleucopis Malloch, 1913
Schizostomyia Malloch, 1934

References

Brachycera families
Diptera of Australasia
Diptera of South America
Acalyptratae